Thanet Parkway railway station is a railway station under construction in Cliffsend, Kent, that will serve  Discovery Park Enterprise Zone and new housing developments. It is due to open in May 2023.

History
In 2012, the developer Cogent announced a planned 800-home development at Manston Green, which would include a Parkway Station on the Ashford - Canterbury - Ramsgate Line. The new station would also serve Kent International Airport via a bus link. A planning application for this was due to be submitted before the end of 2013.

Current proposal
The current proposal by Kent County Council (KCC) is for a Thanet Parkway station on the same section of line but to the west of Cliffsend. This proposal by KCC underwent public consultation in 2015 and was granted planning permission in 2020. Preliminary ground clearance work started in early 2021. 

The project is funded with £14 million from the South East Local Enterprise Partnership via the Local Growth Fund, £12 million from the UK Government Getting Building Fund, £3.4 million from the New Stations Fund, £2 million from Thanet District Council, £700,000 from the East Kent Spatial Development Company and £5.8 million from Kent County Council. £875,000 of extra UK Government funding was required in 2022.

The station is under construction and due to open in May 2023.

Proposed services

References

Thanet
Proposed railway stations in England
2023 establishments in England
Railway stations in Great Britain opened in the 21st century